Rocky Branch is a stream in Washington County in the U.S. state of Missouri. It is a tributary of Mineral Fork.

Rocky Branch was so named on account of its rocky character.

See also
List of rivers of Missouri

References

Rivers of Washington County, Missouri
Rivers of Missouri